Alaca Imaret Mosque or Ishak Pasha Mosque, literally the "colourful mosque", is a 15th-century Ottoman mosque in Thessaloniki, Greece.

Architecture

It was built by order of Ishak Pasha in 1484 or 1487. It consists of a mosque with an imaret (public charity kitchen). The mosque and imaret are not in use anymore. The mosque has a reverse T plan common to early Ottoman architecture, the prayer hall is covered by two large domes, it has a portico covered by five smaller domes. It had one minaret, which was destroyed after 1912, after Thessaloniki was conquered by the Greek Army and became part of the modern Greek state. It is under restoration till now.

References

Picture of the building from above. 

Religious buildings and structures completed in 1487
15th-century mosques
Ottoman architecture in Thessaloniki
Ottoman mosques in Greece
Religion in Thessaloniki
15th-century architecture in Greece
Former mosques in Greece
Mosque buildings with domes